The 2002 Cape Verdean Football Championship season was the 23rd of the competition of the first-tier football in Cape Verde. The competition started on 11 May and finished on 6 July 2002. The tournament was organized by the Cape Verdean Football Federation. Sporting Praia won their fourth title. No club participated in the 2003 CAF Champions League and the 2003 CAF Winners Cup.

Overview 
Onze Unidos was the defending team of the title. A total of 9 clubs, 36 matches were played and 117 goals were scored. It was one of the few seasons that the total number of points would be the champion, it had fewer games compared to other football leagues and this would be the last season to do so. The following season, they used the group system with 4 matches and with playoffs though the semis would be added, also the Santiago and Santo Antão Island Leagues would be split into two and the total number of clubs risen to 11. The number of goals were higher than any other season in history until 2005. Sporting and Bautuque shared the record total of 19 points, no other club surpassed it since, even into the creation of a three-group season with six matches for each club made in May 2017. Batuque scored the most at home, the most in a regular season.

Participants 

 Académica Operária, winner of the Boa Vista Island League
 Académica (Brava), winner of the Brava Island League
 Académica (Fogo), winner of the Fogo Island League
 Onze Unidos, winner of the Maio Island League
 Académico do Aeroporto, winner of the Sal Island League
 Sporting Clube da Praia, winner of the Santiago Island League
 Sanjoanense, winner of the Santo Antão Island League
 SC Atlético, winner of the São Nicolau Island League
 Batuque FC, winner of the São Vicente Island League

Information about the clubs

League standings

Results

Position changes

Statistics 
 Top scorer: Di: 9 goals (Sporting Praia)
 Highest scoring match: Académica Brava 0-9 Sporting Praia (June 29)
 Longest winning streak: Sporting Praia

Footnotes

External links 
 https://web.archive.org/web/20150924011016/http://www.fcf.cv/pt/
 Complete results and rankings at rsssf.com

Cape Verdean Football Championship seasons
Cape
1